Thomas Jørgensen (born 14 July 1992, Aalborg, Denmark), is a Danish speedway rider.

Speedway career
Thomas first came to notice in the United Kingdom in July 2010, whilst a member of the Team Viking touring side. In a meeting against Plymouth he broke the track record and became the first rider to go below 50 seconds. Following a string of impressive performances on that tour Thomas attracted the attention of several Premier League clubs, eventually signing a contract with Scunthorpe Scorpions for the 2011 season. Thomas returned to the United Kingdom late in 2010 for a one off meeting at Scunthorpe where he became winner of the inaugural Rob Woffinden memorial trophy.    

He stayed at Scunthorpe for four seasons in total, averaging around 7 each year before joining Berwick Bandits for the 2015 Premier League speedway season. He averaged just below 8, which sealed another year with the Scottish club for the 2016 season.

In 2017, he joined the King's Lynn Stars and has remained with them since. In 2022, he rode for King's Lynn in the SGB Premiership 2022.

In 2022 he was riding for Nordjsyk in his native Denmark but the club withdrew from the Danish Speedway League which resulted in Jørgensen switching to Holsted Tigers.

In 2023, he re-signed for King's Lynn for the SGB Premiership 2023 and also signed for Berwick Bandits for the SGB Championship 2023, having previously ridden for them during 2015 and 2016.

Career Honours 
2012 Premier League speedway season winner (Scunthorpe)

References 

Danish speedway riders
1992 births
Living people
Sportspeople from Aalborg
Berwick Bandits riders
King's Lynn Stars riders
Newcastle Diamonds riders
Redcar Bears riders
Scunthorpe Scorpions riders
Workington Comets riders